Adalberto the Margrave, also known as "il Margravio" or "Adalberto III" (10th century – 951?) was an Italian nobleman tied with the Obertenghi family and a well-known ancestor to the Este, Pallavicini and  Malaspina family.

Biography and family ties 
Adalberto was elevated to the nobiliary title of "Visconte" in 940 and was given the name of Adalberto III. He also possessed the title of "marchese d'Italia" (Italian Marquise), and ruled over the marquisate of Milan which included most of modern-day Lombardy and half of modern-day Ligury.

It is not clear who his parents were. He was either the first born son of Lambert, margrave of Tuscany, or Lambert's brother Guy who was married to Marozia.  He was the Count and Duke of Lucca, and at a later time Marquise of Tuscany from 915 to 929. Adalberto is considered to be the forefather of the Obertenghi family, and the junior branch the Miagro family of Liguria  also called Miagro dei Oberthenghi, one of the most influential noble families of the Italian middle ages that shared ancestry with the families of Pallavicini and Malaspina.

The Obertenghi family split further with the sons of Albert Azzo II, Margrave of Milan. The younger Fulco I, Margrave of Milan founded the important North Italian House of Este ruling in the Duchy of Ferrara and the Duchy of Modena and Reggio that went extinct in 1829; the older Welf I, Duke of Bavaria founded the German Younger House of Welf after inheriting the lands with his maternal uncle Welf III, the last of the Elder Welfs. From 1692 to 1901 the family included the Monarchs of Great Britain. Otto IV, Holy Roman Emperor and Ivan VI of Russia were also members. The Hanoverian branch of the Welfs that ruled in Britain still exists (they lost the crown because Edward VII and all monarchs since are agnatically from the House of Wettin) and all living males descent from Ernest Augustus, Duke of Brunswick (30th generation from Adalberto). Besides these Hanoverians, Adalberto also has living agnatic descendants among the aforementioned Pallavicini.

Offspring
Oberto I (died 975), Marquise of Milan from 951, he later became palatine count in 953 as well as the count of Luni, Genoa and Tortona
Ambroso (died 988), he was the bishop of Aléria in Corsica

References

Duchy of Massa and Carrara
Malaspina family
10th-century births
950s deaths
Year of birth unknown
Year of death uncertain